Gerald Scheunemann (born 1 October 1960) is a former professional German footballer.

Scheunemann made 31 appearances in the 2. Fußball-Bundesliga for Tennis Borussia Berlin during his playing career.

References 
 

1960 births
Living people
German footballers
Association football midfielders
2. Bundesliga players
Tennis Borussia Berlin players